Alberto Diaspro (born April 7, 1959 in Genoa, Italy) is an Italian scientist. He received his doctoral degree in electronic engineering from the University of Genoa, Italy, in 1983. He is full professor in applied physics at university of Genoa. He is research director of Nanoscopy Italian Institute of Technology. Alberto Diaspro is President of the italian biophysical society SIBPA. In 2022 he got the Gregorio Weber Award for excellence in fluorescence.

References

External links
 https://www.difi.unige.it/en/department/people/alberto-giovanni-diaspro.html
 https://www.iit.it/people/alberto-diaspro
 https://topitalianscientists.org/tis/4511/Alberto_Diaspro_-_Top_Italian_Scientist_in_Physics
 https://www.difi.unige.it/it/news/2021/07/14/alberto-diaspro-e-stato-eletto-presidente-della-societa-italiana-di-biofisica-pura
 https://iss.com/about/news/Alberto-Diaspro-Weber-Award.html

1959 births
Living people
Electronic engineering
Engineers from Genoa
Italian educators
University of Genoa alumni